

Australia
Kayak
 Nathan Baggaley, two Olympic silver medal
 Grant Kenny
 Clint Robinson, three-time Olympic medalist
 Anna Wood, Women's World K2 500 and K2 1000 Champion 1998, Olympic bronze 1996
 Ken Wallace, 2008 Beijing Olympics – Bronze K1 1000 and Gold K1 500

Belarus
Kayak
 Aliaksei Abalmasau
 Volha Khudzenka
 Vadzim Makhneu
 Iryna Pamialova
 Nadzeya Papok
 Raman Piatrushenka
 Maryna Pautaran
 Dziamyan Turchyn

Bulgaria
Canoe
Nikolay Bukhalov
Ivan Burtchin
Fedia Damianov
Lyubomir Lyubenov
Kayak
 Vanja Gesheva-Tsvetkova
 Borislava Ivanova
 Milko Kazanov
 Petar Merkov
 Diana Paliiska
 Ognyana Petrova

Canada
Canoe
 Attila Buday
 Tamas Buday Jr.
 Larry Cain, two Olympic medals
 Richard Dalton, participant in 2004 Summer Olympics
 Steve Giles, bronze medalist in 2000 Summer Olympics
 Ian Mortimer
 Michael Scarola
 Gavin Maxwell, participant in 1996 Summer Olympics

Kayak
 Mylanie Barre
 Caroline Brunet, two silver and one bronze Olympic medals
 Jillian D'Alessio
 Karen Furneaux
 Kamini Jain
 Carrie Lightbound
 Angus Mortimer, participant in 2008 Summer Olympics
 Adam van Koeverden, Olympic champion in K-1 500m sprint in the 2004 Summer Olympics

China
Canoe
 Meng Guanliang
 Yang Wenjun

Kayak
 Wang Lei

Croatia
Canoe
 Emanuel Horvatiček
 Matija Ljubek

Cuba
Canoe
 Ibrahim Rojas Blanco
 Ledis Frank Balceiro Pajon

Czech Republic
Canoe
 Martin Doktor, two Olympic gold medals

Denmark
Canoe
Henning Lynge Jakobsen
Christian Frederiksen
Ivan Burtchin
Peer Nielsen
John Sørensen
Kayak
Karen Hoff
Tove Søby

France
Kayak
 Babak Amir Tahmasseb
 Philippe Colin
 Cyrille Carré

Germany
Canoe
 Andreas Dittmer, three gold, one silver and one bronze Olympic medals
 Christian Gille
 Tomasz Wylenzek
 Robert Nuck
 Stefan Holtz
 Stephan Breuing
 Thomas Lück

Kayak
 Katrin Wagner-Augustin, four gold and one bronze Olympic medals
 Björn Bach
 Birgit Fischer
 Andreas Ihle
 Ronald Rauhe
 Stefan Ulm
 Tim Wieskötter
 Mark Zabel

Great Britain
Kayak
 Emily garner (sexy beast)
 Seb Jones
 Max Massey
 Tom Smith
 Tim Brabants
 Ed McKeever
 Ian Wynne

Hungary
Canoe
 György Kolonics, two gold and two bronze Olympic Medals
 György Kozmann
 Attila Vajda, one Olympic bronze

Kayak
 István Beé
 Zoltán Benkő
 Kinga Bóta
 Natasa Janics
 Zoltán Kammerer
 Rita Kőbán
 Roland Kökény
 Katalin Kovács
 Danuta Kozák
 Gábor Horváth
 Botond Storcz
 Szilvia Szabó
 Ákos Vereckei
 Erzsébet Viski

Israel
Kayak
 Michael Kolganov

Italy
Kayak
 Beniamino Bonomi
 Andrea Facchin
 Josepha Idem
 Antonio Rossi
 Daniele Scarpa

Latvia
Canoe
Ivans Klementjevs

Lithuania
Canoe
 Jevgenij Shuklin
 Raimundas Labuckas

Kayak
 Egidijus Balčiūnas
 Alvydas Duonėla

Mexico
Canoe
 Everardo Cristóbal
 Antonio Romero
 Ramón Ferrer
 Benjamín Castaneda

Netherlands
Kayak
 Annemiek Derckx
 Mieke Jaapies
 Alida van der Anker-Doedens

New Zealand
Kayak
 Lisa Carrington
 Ian Ferguson
 Steven Ferguson
 Cory Hutchings
 Ben Fouhy

Norway
Kayak
 Nils Olav Fjeldheim
 Eirik Verås Larsen
 Knut Holmann

Poland
Canoe
 Paweł Baraszkiewicz
 Marek Dopierała
 Daniel Jędraszko
 Marek Łbik
 Michał Śliwiński

Kayak
 Izabela Dylewska
 Maciej Freimut
 Grzegorz Kotowicz
 Tomasz Mendelski
 Wojciech Kurpiewski
 Aneta Pastuszka
 Karolina Sadalska
 Adam Seroczyński
 Beata Sokołowska-Kulesza
 Marek Twardowski
 Marek Witkowski
 Adam Wysocki

Portugal
Fernando Pimenta
Emanuel Silva

Romania
Canoe
 Ionel Averian
 Antonel Borșan
 Serghei Covaliov
 Gheorghe Danielov
 Florin Georgian Mironcic, current European champion in C-1 1000m
 Marcel Glăvan
 Ivan Patzaichin, most canoe medals in the history of the Summer Olympics
 Florin Popescu
 Leon Rotman
 Silviu Simioncencu
 Gheorghe Simionov

Kayak
Agafia Constantin
Viorica Dumitru
Nastasia Ionescu
Hilde Lauer
Tecla Marinescu
Maria Nichiforov
Cornelia Sideri
Maria Ştefan

Russia
Canoe
 Maksim Opalev, bronze and silver Olympic medals
 Alexander Kostoglod
 Ivan Shtyl
 Aleksandr Kovalyov

Kayak
 Alexander Dyachenko
 Yury Postrigay
 Anatoly Tishchenko

Serbia
Canoe
 Mirko Nišović

Kayak
 Milan Đenadić
 Ognjen Filipovic
 Milan Janić
 Nikolina Moldovan
 Olivera Moldovan
 Antonija Nađ
 Marko Novaković
 Dalma Ružičić-Benedek
 Bora Sibinkić
 Dragan Zoric

Slovakia
Kayak
 Juraj Bača
 Róbert Erban
 Michal Riszdorfer
 Richard Riszdorfer
 Erik Vlček

Slovenia
Kayak
Špela Ponomarenko Janić

South Africa
 Hank McGregor
 Bridgitte Hartley

Spain
Canoe
 David Cal, gold and silver medallist at the 2004 Summer Olympics

Kayak
Saúl Craviotto
Carlos Pérez

Sweden
Kayak
 Henrik Nilsson
 Markus Oscarsson
 Gert Fredriksson
 Susanne Gunnarsson

See more Swedish canoers in :Category:Swedish canoeists

Switzerland
Kayak
Daniela Baumer
Sabine Eichenberger
Ingrid Haralamow
Gabi Müller

Ukraine
Canoe
 Yuriy Cheban
 Maksym Prokopenko

Kayak
 Olena Cherevatova
 Hanna Balabanova
 Inna Osypenko-Radomska
 Tetyana Semykina

United States
Canoe
 Jordan Malloch
 Nathan Johnson

See also
Canoeing at the Olympics

Athl

Kayakers